Minni Kurs-Olesk (13 March 1879 Tartu – 20 October 1940 Tartu) was an Estonian politician. She was a member of Estonian Constituent Assembly.

References

1879 births
1940 deaths
Members of the Estonian Constituent Assembly